Pär Hallström (born 7 May 1947) is a Swedish legal writer and professor emeritus of Law at Umeå University. He graduated from Pantheon-Sorbonne University with a Diplôme d'Etudes Supérieures and holds a doctorate in law from Stockholm University.

Hallström introduced EC constitutional law in Sweden with his work Europeisk Gemenskap och politisk union (European Community and Political Union), 1987, and WTO-law with his book The GATT Panels and the Formation of International Trade Law, 1994.

Hallström's partial bibliography can be found in the Festschrift Festskrift till Pär Hallström (Uppsala 2012).

References

External links
 Publications in the DiVA Academic Archive

1947 births
Living people
Swedish jurists
Legal writers
Academic staff of Umeå University